, also known by the name NoB, is a Japanese singer. He is the former lead singer of the band Make-Up and a Project.R member.

Overview 
With Make-Up, he recorded several songs for the anime Saint Seiya, including the first opening song "Pegasus Fantasy" and the first ending song "Blue Forever". All songs were released in three albums Saint Seiya Hits I (which had the participation of Mitsuko Horie) and Saint Seiya '96 Song Collection.

In his solo career, he recorded the opening song for the Super Sentai series GoGo Sentai Boukenger and Tensou Sentai Goseiger.

He also recorded the song "Never", from the Saint Seiya anime-movie Heaven Chapter ~ Overture.

In 1998, he formed P.A.F. (stands for Patent Applied For, named after the PAF guitar pickups) with X Japan guitarist Pata. In about one years time they released: two albums, one mini album, one live album and two singles.

In July 2007, he sang with Hironobu Kageyama, Masaaki Endoh, Yoko Ishida, Kouji Wada and MoJo at Anime Friends, the biggest anime convention in Latin America, in Brazil; it was his first time in the country and he has gone back there to perform several times not only at Anime Friends, but also in other events in other cities, such as Fortaleza and Brasília.

In 2019, he was responsible for the theme song of the mini-series Super Sentai Strongest Battle. NoB participated in Mary's Blood's heavy metal cover of "Pegasus Fantasy" for their 2020 cover album Re>Animator. He sung it as a duet with their lead vocalist Eye, whom he has coached as a vocalist for the last 10 years.

References

External links 

  Official site
  Nobuo Yamada on Anison Database
  NoB on Anison Database

Japanese male rock singers
1964 births
Living people
Musicians from Osaka
Japanese heavy metal singers